Dour can refer to:

Places
 Dour, a municipality in Belgium
 River Dour, a river in England
 Ad-Dawr (also known as Al-Dour), a town in Iraq
 Ed-Dur (also known as Al Dour and Ad Dour), archeological site in the United Arab Emirates

Other
 Dour (TV serial), Pakistani television series
 Dour (web series), Bangladeshi streaming series
 Dawr (also spelled dour), a genre of Arabic vocal music
 USS Dour (AM-223), Admirable-class minesweeper

See also
 Dours, a commune in France
 N'Dour, typical Gambian and Senegalese patronym